Ichneutica bromias is a moth of the family Noctuidae. This species is endemic to the Chatham Islands of New Zealand where is found on the Chatham, Pitt and Rangatira Islands. This species is similar in appearance to Ichneutica mutans but is darker and duller in its overall appearance. However, as I. mutans is not present in the Chathams this similarity is unlikely to cause confusion. The adults of the species are on the wing from November to March. The life history and the larval host species are unknown.

Taxonomy 
I. bromias was first described by Edward Meyrick in 1902 using four specimens collected from Chatham Island. The lectotype specimen is held at the Natural History Museum, London.

Description 
Meyrick described this species as follows: 

The male of I. bromias has a wingspan of between 34 and42 mm and the female of the species has a wingspan of between 32 and 43 mm. This species is similar in appearance to I. mutans but is darker and duller in appearance. As I. mutans has not been recorded in the Chatham Islands confusion between these two species is unlikely.

Distribution 
This species is endemic to the Chatham Islands of New Zealand. I. bromias is found on the Chatham, Pitt and Rangatira Islands.

Behaviour 
Adult female I. bromias release pheromones to attract males at the lower temperature of 15 degrees Celsius compared to other species in the Ichneutica genus. The adult moths are on the wing from November to March.

Life history and host species 
The life history of this species is unknown as are the host species of the larvae. Similar to other species in the Ichneutica genus is presumed that the larvae of this species exist on a variety of ground cover or low growing herbaceous plants.

References

Hadeninae
Moths of New Zealand
Endemic fauna of New Zealand
Moths described in 1902
Taxa named by Edward Meyrick
Endemic moths of New Zealand